Winogradskyella pacifica is a bacterium from the genus of Winogradskyella which has been isolated from seawater.

References

External links
 microbewiki

Flavobacteria
Bacteria described in 2010